The 2012 Mississippi Valley State Delta Devils football team represented Mississippi Valley State University in the 2012 NCAA Division I FCS football season. The Delta Devils were led by third year head coach Karl Morgan and played their home games at Rice–Totten Field. They were a member of the East Division of the Southwestern Athletic Conference (SWAC) and finished the season with an overall record of five wins and six losses (5–6, 5–4 SWAC).

Media
All Delta Devils games were carried live on WVSD radio.

Schedule

References

Mississippi Valley State
Mississippi Valley State Delta Devils football seasons
Mississippi Valley State Delta Devils football